Tsghuk is a village in the Gorayk Municipality of the Syunik Province in Armenia.

Demographics 

The Statistical Committee of Armenia reported its population as 451 in 2010, up from 427 at the 2001 census.

References 

Populated places in Syunik Province